Vladimir Ivanovich Kozlovsky (1867 - 1930) was a Russian Impressionist painter.

Biography
At the age of 13 years, Vladimir Kozlovsky entered the Moscow School of Painting, Sculpture and Architecture, where he studied with Konstantin Korovin and Isaac Levitan. His professional development was heavily influenced by his friends as well as his teachers, Alexei Savrasov, Vasily Polenov and Vasily Perov. After graduation in 1887, Vladimir went back to Kiev and was soon accepted by the Kiev Imperial Society for the Encouragement of the Arts (1890 - 1896). Kozlovsky's early paintings won multiple awards in Kiev and Moscow during these years, including "Quiet Monastery" (1892), "Sweet home" (1893), "Noon" (1894) and "Pine Forest" (1895).

By the beginning of the 20th century, Kozlovsky became one of the Russian impressionists, joining the growing art movement in the country. In his paintings, Vladimir connected the landscape painting traditions of his teacher, Vasily Polenov, with genre scenes of Vasily Perov, vividly describing simple life of Ukrainian peasants. In 1915, Vladimir Kozlovsky was a founding member of the Kiev Society of Artists (1914-1919) and served as Secretary of this society for 5 years. His paintings were exhibited throughout the Russian Empire, including Moscow, Saint Petersburg, Kiev, Odessa, Kharkov, Zhytomyr and other cities. Several of his most famous pieces, such as "Winter", "Printemps", "Road to Zhytomyr", "Pond", "At the river", "Fishermen" were published as postcards.

After the Russian Revolution of 1917, many painters had to leave the country. The new communist ideology was particularly hostile to the "bourgeois" impressionist art movement, deemed to be incompatible with the communist values. Vladimir Kozlovsky remained in Kiev and started working as an illustrator of children's books, cooperating with the same publishing houses that earlier were publishing his paintings. Vladimir Kozlovsky died in 1930, and was buried in the old Baikove Cemetery in Kiev

Works

References

External links

Artinvestment.RU. Selected artworks of Vladimir Kozlovsky
Vladimir Ivanovich Kozlovsky. Biography and Artworks
Postcards by Vladimir Kozlovsky

20th-century Russian painters
Russian landscape painters
19th-century painters from the Russian Empire
Russian genre painters
Russian realist painters
Russian Impressionist painters
Artists from Kyiv
1867 births
1930 deaths
Moscow School of Painting, Sculpture and Architecture alumni